The 470s decade ran from January 1, 470, to December 31, 479.

Significant people

References